Débidibi is a village in the commune of Robbah, in Robbah District, El Oued Province, Algeria.

References

Neighbouring towns and cities

Populated places in El Oued Province